Song of the Buckaroo is a 1938 American Western film directed by Albert Herman and written by John Rathmell. The film stars Tex Ritter, Jinx Falkenburg, Mary Ruth, Tom London, Frank LaRue and Charles King. The film was released on December 7, 1938, by Monogram Pictures.

Plot
In order to escape the law, a bandit takes the identity of a dead man, when is dead alter ego gets elected as mayor he decides to change his outlaw ways.

Cast          
Tex Ritter as Texas Dan
Jinx Falkenburg as Evelyn Bayliss
Mary Ruth as Mary Ruth Alden
Tom London as Sheriff Wade
Frank LaRue as Rev. Bayliss
Charles King as Max Groat
Bob Terry as Neal
Horace Murphy as Cashaway
George Chesebro as Fargo
Snub Pollard as Perky
Ernie Adams as Cashier
Dave O'Brien as Tex Alden
Dorothy Fay as Anna Alden

References

External links
 

1938 films
American Western (genre) films
1938 Western (genre) films
Monogram Pictures films
Films directed by Albert Herman
American black-and-white films
1930s English-language films
1930s American films